Hollister is an unincorporated community in Putnam County, Florida, United States of America. It is located off State Road 20, between Interlachen and Palatka.  The ZIP Code for Hollister is 32147.

Geography
Hollister is located at  (29.6225, -81.8139).

References

Unincorporated communities in Putnam County, Florida
Unincorporated communities in Florida